Jacques Flouret (8 September 1907 – 4 October 1973) was a multi-talented French athlete.

Track and field career
Flouret won three medals in the pentathlon and javelin throw, at the Student World Championships of 1927 and 1928. He finished 28th in the long jump at the 1928 Summer Olympics.

Basketball career
Between 1930 and 1938, Flouret played in 25 international games as a shooting guard, for the senior French national basketball team, and scored 48 points. Those 25 games included the opening match of France-Estonia, at the 1936 Summer Olympics, and the EuroBasket 1937 tournament, where France won the bronze medal. He was inducted into the French Basketball Hall of Fame, in 2010.

Post-athletic career
After retiring from sports in 1938, Flouret had a long career as a sports official in France.

References

1907 births
1973 deaths
French male long jumpers
French men's basketball players
Athletes (track and field) at the 1928 Summer Olympics
Basketball players at the 1936 Summer Olympics
Olympic athletes of France
Olympic basketball players of France
Shooting guards
20th-century French people